Ambat Chacko Jose (5 February 1937 – 23 January 2016) was an Indian politician. He was Speaker of the Kerala Legislative Assembly and a Member of Parliament from Thrissur and Idukki constituencies in Kerala. The Times of India calls him The Always Casting Jose of Kerala as he saved the K. Karunakaran government by exercising his casting vote a record seven times in around 80 days as the ruling United Democratic Front and the opposition Left Democratic Front faced a 70–70 tie in the Kerala assembly.

Biography 
A. C. Jose was born on 5 February 1937 in Edapally, Ernakulam. He belonged to the well known Ambat family. He studied at St. Alberts College, and Government Law College and took his BSc and LLM degrees. He played a dominant role in the formation of Kerala Students Union. From 1969 to 1979 he was a councillor in the Cochin City Corporation and in 1972 he was elected as mayor of the Corporation. He was elected member to the Kerala Legislative Assembly from Paravur constituency in 1980. He served as Speaker of Kerala Legislative Assembly in 1982.

He was elected as MP in the 1996, 1998, 1999 general elections, serving in the 11th, 12th and 13th Lok Sabha. He was the chief editor of Veekshanam Daily, a mouthpiece of the Indian National Congress party in Kerala. He died suddenly on 23 January 2016 aged 79 after suffering from a massive heart attack. He was buried with full state honours at Ernakulam, his hometown.

References

External links
Official biographical sketch in Parliament of India website

1937 births
2016 deaths
Speakers of the Kerala Legislative Assembly
People from Ernakulam district
India MPs 1996–1997
India MPs 1998–1999
India MPs 1999–2004
Lok Sabha members from Kerala
Indian National Congress politicians from Kerala
Kerala MLAs 1980–1982
Kerala MLAs 1982–1987
Politicians from Kochi
Indian National Congress (U) politicians